Dr Elimelech Hanakumbo Bulowa Mwanang'onze is a Zambian academic and former politician. He served as Member of the National Assembly for Bweengwa from 1988 until 1991, as well as holding the post of Minister of General Education, Youth and Sport.

Biography
Mwanang'onze obtained an MSc in geology at the University of Manitoba in 1974, before earning a PhD at the same university in 1978. He later worked as a lecturer at the School of Mines at the University of Zambia, and was chair of the Journal of African Marxists' editorial committee. He subsequently became a civil servant and was Permanent Secretary for Mines.

Mwanang'onze was elected to the National Assembly in the 1988 general elections at a time when Zambia was a one-party state with the United National Independence Party as the sole legal party. When multi-party democracy was introduced in the early 1990s, he did not contest the 1991 general elections and was succeeded by Baldwin Nkumbula.

References

University of Manitoba alumni
Academic staff of the University of Zambia
Zambian civil servants
Zambian academics
Zambian non-fiction writers
Marxist writers
United National Independence Party politicians
Members of the National Assembly of Zambia
Education ministers of Zambia
21st-century Zambian writers
20th-century Zambian writers